Kenny Tutt is a British cook and winner of the MasterChef 2018 UK TV show competition.

His winning three-course meal prepared for judges John Torode and Gregg Wallace consisted of:

 First course: Roast scallops, smoked cauliflower, shimeji mushroom and pancetta
 Main course: Squab pigeon breast and bon-bon, heritage beetroot, baby turnip, spiced cherries, bread sauce, and game jus
 Dessert: Bitter chocolate, ale ice-cream, malt tuile and smoked caramel

Early life

Tutt was born in London in 1982 to an English father, Kenneth and Irish mother Lynette and was raised in London, Hove and Pulborough. 
He started cooking from a young age having been influenced watching his mother cook.

Career

He started a career and spent 20 years in banking and was a bank manager before he decided to take up cooking. His wife Lucy persuaded him to enter MasterChef. 
Since winning MasterChef he has now opened his own restaurant and cookery school called Pitch in Worthing, West Sussex. He has now opened The Bayside Social on Worthing’s seafront.

Personal life

He lives in Worthing, West Sussex with his wife, Lucy and two daughters Emily and Grace

References

External links
Official website
Pitch Restaurant

Living people
1982 births
English chefs
British chefs
English television chefs
Reality cooking competition winners